Wisdom Niiayitey Quaye July (born 8 April 1998) is a Honduran professional footballer who plays as a defender for Real España.

Career
Of Ghanaian descent, Quaye represented Honduras at the 2015 FIFA U-17 World Cup.

References

External links
 
 
 

Living people
1998 births
Honduran footballers
Honduras youth international footballers
Honduras international footballers
Association football midfielders
C.D.S. Vida players
Real C.D. España players
Liga Nacional de Fútbol Profesional de Honduras players
Honduran people of Ghanaian descent
People from La Ceiba